The Grant Motor Co was an American automobile manufacturing company which produced automobiles from 1913 to 1922. The company was based in Findlay, Ohio. The company produced several thousand four and six cylinder automobiles and even exported cars to England as the Whiting-Grant. In 1916, a five-passenger touring car produced by the company sold for US$795.

See also
 List of defunct United States automobile manufacturers
 Brass Era car

References

External links
 Grant Six Model H (1921) - A promotional brochure with "a brief description of the Touring Car, Roadster, Coupe, and Sedan" including detailed specifications.

Motor vehicle manufacturers based in Ohio
Defunct manufacturing companies based in Ohio
1910s cars
1920s cars
Defunct motor vehicle manufacturers of the United States
Vehicle manufacturing companies established in 1913
1913 establishments in Ohio
1922 disestablishments in Ohio
Vehicle manufacturing companies disestablished in 1922
Findlay, Ohio